Tal is a village in Jask Rural District, in the Central District of Jask County, Hormozgan Province, Iran. At the 2006 census, its population was 52, in 8 families.

References 

Populated places in Jask County